Moton Field Municipal Airport  is a public-use airport located three nautical miles (3.5 mi, 5.6 km) north of the central business district of Tuskegee, a city in Macon County, Alabama, United States. The airport is owned by the City of Tuskegee. It is included in the FAA's National Plan of Integrated Airport Systems for 2011–2015, which categorized it as a general aviation facility.

Moton Field is home to the Tuskegee Airmen National Historic Site.

Facilities and aircraft 
It has one runway designated 13/31 with an asphalt surface measuring 5,005 by 100 feet (1,526 x 30 m).

For the 12-month period ending December 9, 2009, the airport had 19,530 general aviation aircraft operations, an average of 53 per day. At that time there were 9 aircraft based at this airport: 100% single-engine.

See also 
 Alabama World War II Army Airfields

References

External links 
 
 

Airports in Alabama
USAAF Contract Flying School Airfields
Airfields of the United States Army Air Forces in Alabama
Transportation buildings and structures in Macon County, Alabama